Exo Chora is a village and a community on Zakynthos island, Greece. It is situated near the rugged west coast of the island, 2 km south of Maries and 19 km west of Zakynthos (city). The community consists of the villages Exo Chora and Kampi.

Populated places in Zakynthos